Technorealism is an attempt to expand the middle ground between techno-utopianism and Neo-Luddism by assessing the social and political implications of technologies so that people might all have more control over the shape of their future. An account cited that technorealism emerged in the early 1990s and was introduced by Douglas Rushkoff and Andrew Shapiro. In a manifesto released, which described the term as a new generation of cultural criticism, it was stated that the goal was not to promote or dismiss technology but to understand it so the application could be aligned with basic human values. Technorealism suggests that a technology, however revolutionary it may seem, remains a continuation of similar revolutions throughout human history.

Approach 
The technorealist approach involves a continuous critical examination of how technologies might help or hinder people in the struggle to improve the quality of their lives, their communities, and their economic, social, and political structures. In addition, instead of policy wonks, experts, and the elite, it is the technology critic who assumes the center stage in the discourse of technology policy issues.

Although technorealism began with a focus on U.S.-based concerns about information technology, it has evolved into an international intellectual movement with a variety of interests such as biotechnology and nanotechnology.

See also
Technocriticism
 History of science and technology

Ethics

Bioethics
Infoethics
Neuroethics

Nanoethics
Roboethics
Technoethics
 Technology

References

External links
technorealism.org, historical site

Applied ethics
Ethics of science and technology
Technology neologisms
Philosophy of technology
Technology systems